Petr Urban (born 8 August 1960) is a Czech luger. He competed at the 1988 Winter Olympics and the 1992 Winter Olympics.

References

External links
 

1960 births
Living people
Czech male lugers
Olympic lugers of Czechoslovakia
Lugers at the 1988 Winter Olympics
Lugers at the 1992 Winter Olympics
Place of birth missing (living people)